Faulkender Ridge is an ice-covered ridge about  long, located west of Horrall Glacier in the northwest part of the Kohler Range, Marie Byrd Land, Antarctica. It was mapped by the United States Geological Survey (USGS) from ground surveys and U.S. Navy air photos, 1959–65, and was named by the Advisory Committee on Antarctic Names for DeWayne J. Faulkender, a USGS topographic engineer with the Marie Byrd Land Survey party, 1966–67.

References 

Ridges of Marie Byrd Land